Robert Scott (born 2 October 1870, date of death unknown) was a professional footballer who played for Scotland against Ireland in the 1893–94 British Home Championship. Scott was born in Airdrie, North Lanarkshire.

Career
Scott played for Airdrieonians for around ten years from 1888. During his time at the club, the "Diamonds" joined Division Two of the Scottish League in 1894. Scott also had a one-match loan to Celtic on 29 April 1893. Scott was appearing in place of Mick Mulvey, and helped Celtic secure a 3–0 victory over Rangers, which ultimately led Celtic to win their first league title. He suffered a broken leg just before the turn of the century which effectively ended his playing career.

Scott made one appearance for Scotland, a 2–1 victory over Ireland on 31 March 1894, during the 1893–94 British Home Championship.

Playing style
Scott was noted for his "fierce low shots".

Family
Scott's brother, Matthew Scott, also played for Airdrieonians and played for Scotland in 1898.

References

1870 births
Year of death missing
Scottish footballers
Scotland international footballers
Footballers from Airdrie, North Lanarkshire
Airdrieonians F.C. (1878) players
Celtic F.C. players
Scottish Football League players
Association football inside forwards
Place of death missing